Sieminski (masculine), Sieminska (feminine) and  Siemieński (masculine), Siemieńska (feminine)  are Polish surnames. Notable people with the surname include: 

Alfred Dennis Sieminski (1911–1990), American politician
Chuck Sieminski (1939–2020), American football player
Edmund Sieminski (1932–2021), American politician
Józef Siemieński (1882–1941), Polish archivist and historian of law
Lucjan Siemieński (1807–1877), Polish poet
, Polish cyclist, the namesake of the Memoriał Romana Siemińskiego

See also

Polish-language surnames